Maloye Oksilovo is a rural locality (a village) in Vakhnevskoye Rural Settlement, Nikolsky District, Vologda Oblast, Russia. The population was 23 as of 2002.

Geography 
Maloye Oksilovo is located 41 km northwest of Nikolsk (the district's administrative centre) by road. Bolshoye Oksilovo is the nearest rural locality.

References 

Rural localities in Nikolsky District, Vologda Oblast